Fyodor Mikhailovich Slavyansky (1817–1876) was a Russian painter. He was born a serf of the landlady Avdotya Nikolayevna Semenova, in the village of Vyshkovo in Tver Guberniya. He became Venetsianov’s student in 1839 in his estate of Safonkovo. Venetsianov did his best to buy freedom to Slavyansky. In 1840, he asked the Academy to allow his student to visit lessons in drawing. Slavyansky studied in classes of professors Varnek and Markov, and simultaneously worked with Venetsianov. In 1845, he got the title of a freelance artist.

External links
Olga's Gallery Slavyansky
Family history

1817 births
1876 deaths
19th-century painters from the Russian Empire
Russian male painters
Russian serfs
19th-century male artists from the Russian Empire